Published between 1954 and 1981 Two Tone was a quarterly of Rhodesian poetry magazine, which signified a radical break with the largely conservative Eurocentric academic traditions which until then had dominated Zimbabwean poetry. Publishing poetry by both black and white writers working, predominantly in English but also in Ndebele and Shona, it challenged divisions and created a new open field for expression in divergent poetic voices and styles.

History and profile
Two Tone was launched in 1954. The founders were Phillippa Berlyn and Olive Robertson. While the magazine was published in association with the National Arts Foundation of Rhodesia and the University of Rhodesia's English Department the selection process was left to the journal's rotating board of editors, whose focus on "good writing," "technical skill," "stylistic innovation" and "authentic expression" provided a foundation for much of the groundbreaking new literature that exploded in Zimbabwe in the 1970.

In 1976 Kizito Zhiradzigo Muchemwa became the editor-in-chief of the magazine, being the first black editor. The magazine folded in 1981.

Content and themes
Two Tone prioritised the author of the imagination rather than the revisionist historian or political revolutionary - a position which became increasing tenuous during the oppressive years of the Ian Smith regime. The magazine received scathing criticism from academics, political activist and many black poets who increasingly saw it as a "banal" and "pretentious outlet" for a closed minority of "White literati", whose "patronizing approach" to black writing supported the political status quo. The antagonism was only exacerbated by the publication of defensive editorials which argued that "separatism and elitism" create the assurances of liberty to "foster imaginative literature."

Despite the controversy, the journal's legacy is secured through the writing of seminal contemporary Zimbabwean poets such as D. F. Middleton, Julius Chingono, Charles Mungoshi, Bonus Zimunya, John Eppel and Patricia Schonstein, all of whom began their literary careers on the pages of Two Tone.

References

 Two Tone XIII March 1977, editorial by Olive Robertson, p2
 Two Tone XIII, September 1977, editorial by V. Crawford, p1-4
 R. Graham, "Poetry In Rhodesia," Zambezia: The Journal. of Humanities of the University of Zimbabwe VI ii), 1978, ip208
 John Reed. ""Emergence of English Writing in Zimbabwe," European-language Writing in Sub-Saharan Africa, John Benjamins Publishing Company, 1986, p251
 Robert Muponde, Ranka Primorac. Versions of Zimbabwe: New Approaches to Literature and Culture, African Book Collective, 2005

External links
Zimbabwe — Poetry International Web
National Arts Council of Zimbabwe website

Defunct literary magazines
Defunct magazines published in Zimbabwe
Magazines established in 1954
Magazines disestablished in 1981
Multilingual magazines
Poetry literary magazines
Quarterly magazines
Magazines published in Zimbabwe